The New Zealand women's national cricket team toured India in November and December 2003. They played India in one Test match and five One Day Internationals, drawing the Test and losing the ODI series 4–1.

Squads

Tour Matches

2-day match: Women's Cricket Association of India v New Zealand

50-over match: Women's Cricket Association of India President's XI v New Zealand

Only WTest

WODI Series

1st ODI

2nd ODI

3rd ODI

4th ODI

5th ODI

References

External links
New Zealand Women tour of India 2003/04 from Cricinfo

International cricket competitions in 2004
2004 in women's cricket
Women's international cricket tours of India
New Zealand women's national cricket team tours